The National District is a high school conference in the state of Virginia that includes schools from eastern Fairfax County and all of the public high schools in Arlington County.

The National District was founded in 1993 as part of an attempted realignment of the Northern Region.  The charter members of the district were Edison, Mount Vernon, Justice, Wakefield, Washington-Liberty, West Potomac, and Yorktown High Schools.

Currently five of the eight member high schools compete at the 5A level and the remaining three at the largest 6A level in VHSL.  With the 2013 post-season conference realignment, the 5A schools are a part of the post-season conference 13 and the 6A schools reside in conference 6, with Liberty District high schools.  This process has been deemed very confusing due to the inter-twinning of regular season districts and post-season conferences. Generally speaking, the regular season conferences have been kept together for local purposes while the post-season conferences were put together for school population matters.

Membership changes
Most of the National District schools have stayed intact since its founding.  In 1996, West Potomac moved from the National to the Patriot and Falls Church was added from the Liberty District.  From 2003 to 2005, Jefferson moved from the Concorde to the National only for football, where the Colonials clinched a Division 5 playoff berth in 2004.

Loudoun Valley of Purcellville was added in 2005 as a full member for football, but as a part-time member in other sports by participating only in post season district tournaments, because it was located about 50 miles or more west of the National District schools.  In sports other than football, Valley played an independent schedule, usually against schools in the AA Dulles District.  In 2007, Loudoun Valley was moved to the Northwest Region which was regarded as a welcomed move to the National District's members.

Hayfield joined the National in 2009, as its population was cut nearly in half by the opening of South County in 2005 making it a struggle for the Hawks to compete with schools in the Patriot District whose student bodies were nearly double.

Starting with the 2015–16 school year, the National District will have the same membership as Capitol Conference 13.(2) The number of schools in the National District will reduce from eight to seven. Mt. Vernon, which has been reclassified as a 6A size school starting with the 2015–16 season, and Hayfield, already a 6A, moves to the Patriot District/Conference 7. Arlington County high schools Washington-Liberty and Yorktown, who were already 6A in size since the 2013–14 school year, will shift from the National to the Liberty District/Conference 6 to join those 6A size schools. Moving from the Liberty to the National will be George C. Marshall and Thomas Jefferson. John R. Lewis comes to the National/Capitol from the Patriot. All those schools are 5A in size. The new district changes means all the schools in the former Northern Region under the three classification setup will now have all 6A and 5A schools grouped in the same districts as their conference assignments with the new six classification arrangement.

As of July 1, 2021, the National District would consolidate with the remaining Gunston District members, and continue to bear the National District name moving forward, thus ending the 2nd incarnation of the Gunston District.

Membership History

Current members
Annandale Atoms of Annandale
Edison Eagles of Alexandria
Falls Church Jaguars of Falls Church
Hayfield Hawks of Alexandria
Justice Wolves of Falls Church
John R. Lewis Lancers of Springfield
Mount Vernon Majors of Alexandria
Thomas Jefferson Colonials of Alexandria

Former Members
George Marshall Statesmen of Falls Church (2015-2021)
Loudoun Valley Vikings of Purcellville (2005-2007)
Wakefield Warriors of Arlington (1994-2021)
Washington-Liberty Generals of Arlington (1994-2015)
West Potomac Wolverines of Alexandria (1994-1996)
Yorktown Patriots of Arlington (1994-2015)

2021-2022 district champions

Fall Sports District Champions
Cheerleading: Justice
Boys Cross Country: Thomas Jefferson
Girls Cross Country: Hayfield
Field Hockey: Justice
Golf: Edison
Football: Hayfield
Volleyball:  Justice 

Winter Sports District Champions
Boys Basketball: Hayfield 
Girls Basketball: Edison
Girls Gymnastics: 
Boys Swimming: 
Girls Swimming: 
Boys Indoor Track: Edison
Girls Indoor Track: Hayfield
Wrestling: Edison

Spring Sports District Champions
Baseball: 
Boys Lacrosse: 
Girls Lacrosse: 
Boys Soccer: Justice 
Girls Soccer: 
Softball: Edison
Boys Tennis: 
Girls Tennis: 
Boys Track: 
Girls Track:

State champions since 2004
{| class="wikitable" style="float:center;"
|-
! colspan=3 | Virginia State Championships
|-
! Year
! Sport/Competition
!School
|-
|2004
|AAA Forensics
|Edison
|-
|2005
|AAA Debate
|Edison
|-
|2006
|AAA Debate
|Yorktown
|-
|2006
|AAA Girls Swimming and Diving
|Yorktown
|-
|2007
|AAA Girls Swimming and Diving
|Yorktown
|-
|2007
|AAA Debate
|Yorktown
|-
|2008
|AAA Debate
|Yorktown
|-
|2009
|AAA Forensics
|West Springfield
|-
|2009
|AAA Debate
|West Springfield
|-
|2010
|AAA Forensics
|Yorktown
|-
|2013
|AAA Swim & Dive
|Falls Church
|-
|}

References

External links

Northern Virginia
Virginia High School League
Education in Fairfax County, Virginia
Education in Arlington County, Virginia